Newa FM is a Nepali community radio station with a 100 Watt transmitter operated by the Newar Cultural Center.  The station is located in Kirtipur, Nepal, Ward # 2.  It started the transmission on May 25, 2009.  Currently the station broadcasts from 7-9 AM and 2-5 PM in the Newari language.  

The station uses a TX 100/S Plus transmitter made by Cte broadcast, Italy.

References

Radio stations in Nepal
2009 establishments in Nepal